Gaameedle (Somali: Gaameedle Arabic: جامدل) are a Somali clan mainly from the southern coastal cities of; Marka and Mogadishu.

Overview 
The  clan Gaameedle are said to be Hadarmi ancestry according to their elders and are said to be Al Hamdani in origin. Prior to colonisation the Gaameedle were known to have ruled Marka and were allied with the Ajuuran clan who had ruled Marka hinterlands for two centuries before the Biimaal took over the area outside the city. Near their mosque, in the heart of the ancient city, there is the ruin of a palace that is said to have been the seat of Wakil Samo Nayb, the last governor of Ajuran empire theocracy.

Clan tree 
A summarised clan tree of the Gameedle is shown below:

 Gaameedle
 Haji Warrow
 Aw Samow
 Aw Qaadirow 
 Haji  Abaas
 Haji Amin
 Osmankeey
 Qadhiib

Distribution 
The Gaameedle are primarily based in Marka, however can be found in other coastal settlements in such as Mogadishu, Gendershe and villages in the hinterlands. The Haji Warrow, Haji Abaas and Reer Qadhiib are primarily based in Marka, whilst the Osmankeey are primarily based in Shingani. Whereas, Haji Amin are primarily based in Gendershe and Jilib Marka, where they make one of the 7 sub clans of the Gendershe. The Gaameedle also live in hinterlands in other urban centres such as, Baidoa, Afgooye, Janaale, Qoryooley, Buulo Mareer and small villages such Idimow, Jmaame, and Jeerow

References 

Ethnic groups in Somalia
Somali clans